Radiant House is an architecturally notable building in Mortimer Street, in the City of Westminster, London. It is a grade II listed building.

The building was commissioned by Ernest Eugene Pither to honour the memory of Sophia Elizabeth Pither, née Bézier, and it was completed in January 1915. The building was designed by Francis Léon Pither, although a plaque on the building shows "F. M. Elgood, FRIBA" as the architect.

References

External links 

London Details - Radiant House

Grade II listed buildings in the City of Westminster
Fitzrovia
Residential buildings completed in 1915